Joseph Chalmers (born 3 January 1994) is a Scottish footballer who plays as a left-back or midfielder for Dunfermline Athletic. He previously played for Celtic, Falkirk, Motherwell, Inverness Caledonian Thistle, Ross County and Ayr United.

Career

Celtic
Raised in Cambuslang and a pupil at Trinity High School, Rutherglen,
Chalmers joined Celtic at the age of 10 and went on to progress through the youth ranks at the club's academy. Along with four other youngsters, he signed his first professional contract in December 2011. A member of the club's under-20 side, on 25 August 2012, he made his senior debut for Celtic, coming on as a 76th-minute substitute in a Scottish Premier League match against Inverness Caledonian Thistle, replacing Emilio Izaguirre.

On 31 January 2014, Chalmers signed for Falkirk on loan until the end of the 2013–14 season. He made his Falkirk debut at left-back in a 2–0 defeat to Queen of the South at Palmerston Park on 8 February 2014. In his spell at Falkirk, he made a total of 11 appearances. He was injured for the Bairns Scottish Premiership play-off campaign, meaning his last appearance came in a 3–1 home win against Alloa on 3 May 2014. Afterwards, he returned to Celtic.

After his return, Chalmers was given another chance under new manager, Ronny Deila. However, multiple injuries such as persistent groin and hip problems reduced his playing time much further. At the end of the 2014–15 season, Chalmers was released by the club.

Motherwell
On 4 June 2015, Chalmers signed for Scottish Premiership club Motherwell on a two-year contract. Upon signing for the club, he said the move might not have happened had Motherwell lost to Rangers in the play-offs. He made his debut on 1 August 2015, in a 1–0 win against Inverness Caledonian Thistle. He was released by the club in May 2017, at the end of his contract.Former Celtic kid Joe Chalmers opens up on life without a club after Motherwell exit, Daily Record, 16 June 2017

Inverness Caledonian Thistle
On 13 July 2017, Chalmers signed a two-year contract for Scottish Championship club Inverness Caledonian Thistle.Marcus Fraser and Joe Chalmers to be friendly foes in Highland derby Press and Journal, 22 September 2018 He scored his first career goal versus Queen of the South in a 3–1 win, in which the ball rolled over the line after being deflected around the box by the defenders.

Ross County
On 20 May 2019, Chalmers left Inverness and joined their bitter rivals, Ross County, making the list of a few players to have "crossed the bridge".

 Ayr United 
In September 2020, Chalmers joined Ayr United on a two-year deal.

 Dunfermline Athletic 
On 24 January 2022, Chalmers joined Dunfermline Athletic for an undisclosed fee on an 18-month contract.

International career
Chalmers represented Scotland at under-16, under-17, under-19, under-20 and under-21 levels.

Career statistics
 

HonoursCelticScottish Premier League: 2012–13Inverness CT'
Scottish Challenge Cup: 2017–18

References

External links

1994 births
Association football fullbacks
Sportspeople from Cambuslang
People educated at Trinity High School, Rutherglen
Celtic F.C. players
Falkirk F.C. players
Motherwell F.C. players
Living people
Scotland youth international footballers
Scottish footballers
Scottish Premier League players
Scotland under-21 international footballers
Scottish Professional Football League players
Inverness Caledonian Thistle F.C. players
Ross County F.C. players
Ayr United F.C. players
Dunfermline Athletic F.C. players
Footballers from South Lanarkshire